William Harmong Lamar [Good Time Bill] (March 21, 1897 – May 24, 1970) was a left fielder in Major League Baseball who played from 1917 through 1927 for the New York Yankees, Boston Red Sox, Brooklyn Robins, and Philadelphia Athletics. He was born in Rockville, Maryland.

In a nine-season career, Lamar was a .310 hitter (633-for-2040) with 19 home runs and 245 RBI in 550 games, including 303 runs, 114 doubles, 23 triples, 25 stolen bases, and a 1.10 walk-to-strikeout ratio (86-to-78).

Lamar died in Rockport, Massachusetts at age 73.

Highlights
In 1925 posted career-highs with a .356 average (7th in American League), 202 hits, 85 runs, 77 RBI and 50 extra-base hits, including a 28-game hitting-streak.
Appeared in the 1920 World Series.

References

Sources
Bill Lamar - Baseballbiography.com

Retrosheet

Major League Baseball left fielders
Boston Red Sox players
Brooklyn Robins players
New York Yankees players
Philadelphia Athletics players
Baltimore Orioles (IL) players
Frederick Hustlers players
Louisville Colonels (minor league) players
Newark Bears (IL) players
Rochester Hustlers players
Toledo Iron Men players
Toledo Mud Hens players
Baseball players from Maryland
1897 births
1970 deaths